The Charanjit Singh Channi ministry was the Cabinet ministry of Punjab headed by the Chief Minister of Punjab, Charanjit Singh Channi, India between the years 2021 and 2022.

The Fifteenth Punjab assembly was dissolved on 11 March 2022. The dissolution was necessitated after the results of the election was declared on 10 March.

A day after the election results announced in Punjab on 10 March 2022, Chief Minister Charanjit Singh Channi along with whole cabinet resigned from the government. New cabinet Mann ministry lead by Bhagwant Mann of Aam Aadmi Party took oath of office on 16 March.

The following is the list of ministers with their portfolios in the Government of Punjab.

Council of Ministers

References

Channi
2021 establishments in Punjab, India
Cabinets established in 2021
State cabinet ministers of Punjab, India
2021 in Indian politics